The New Statesman is a British television sitcom which first aired on BBC 2. It consists of seven episodes, including the original pilot. It is unrelated to the ITV series of the same name which began three years later.

The life of the pompous, grandiose curator of a small agricultural museum near Aylesbury is turned upside down when he inherits a Welsh Earldom. However, his inheritance turns out to be far less grandiose than he expects.

Main cast
 Windsor Davies as George Vance 
 Anna Dawson as  Enid Vance
 Sean Chapman as Robert Vance
 Madeline Adams as  Clementine Vance
 Ivor Roberts as Phillip Thomas
 Eilian Wyn as  Owen Thomas
 Victoria Plucknett as Leonora Thomas 
 Julian Curry as Lecturer
 Paul Beech as Butler

References

Bibliography

External links
 

1984 British television series debuts
1985 British television series endings
1980s British comedy television series
BBC television sitcoms
English-language television shows
Television shows set in Buckinghamshire